Theo Findahl (24 August 1891 – 19 May 1976) was a Norwegian teacher, journalist and foreign correspondent.

Theodor Leonard Findahl was born in Tvedestrand in Aust-Agder, Norway.  He was awarded a philological degree at the University of Oslo (1917). He worked as teacher until 1939, and from then as a foreign correspondent for the newspaper Aftenposten. He is particularly remembered for his reports from Germany on 5 and 7 April 1940, when he was a news correspondent in Berlin. These reports warned about the German attack on Norway, but the message was not taken seriously by the Norwegian Commanding Admiral.

After the war, he was a foreign correspondent for Aftenposten in London, New York City and finally in Rome. Among his books are Kloster og arena. Streiftog i Spanien from 1926, Den gule keiservei. Inntrykk fra Japan from 1933, Undergang. Berlin 1939–1945 from 1945, and Lange skygger. Dagbok fra krigens Berlin 1939–1945 from 1964.

References

1891 births
1976 deaths
People from Tvedestrand
University of Oslo alumni
Norwegian newspaper reporters and correspondents
Norwegian schoolteachers
Norwegian expatriates in Germany
Norwegian people of World War II
Norwegian spies
Norwegian memoirists
20th-century memoirists